"Tonight's the Night" is the sixth and final single off of Blackstreet's self-titled debut album, Blackstreet. The remix version features R&B group SWV and rapper Craig Mack. It was released on August 1, 1995. The original version of the song features Tammy Lucas (who also wrote the song). All versions of the song feature Chauncey Hannibal on lead vocals. "Tonight's the Night" charted on three Billboard charts: number 80 on the Hot 100, 27 on the Hot R&B/Hip-Hop Singles & Tracks and 12 on the Hot Dance Music/Maxi-Singles Sales charts. A music video was made for the single, which was directed by Hype Williams.

1994 songs
1995 singles
Interscope Records singles
Songs written by Teddy Riley
Song recordings produced by Teddy Riley
Blackstreet songs
Songs written by Pharrell Williams
Songs written by Chad Hugo